Agnipariksha is an Indian Telugu language love and drama series airing on Zee Telugu from Monday - Saturday at 9:30 PM from 18 October 2021 and ended on 22 October 2022. It stars Thanuja Puttaswamy, Aakarsh Byramudi, Navin Vetri and Maahi Gouthami in lead roles. It also available on digital streaming platform ZEE5.

Synopsis 
Radhika and Amar love each other. Radhika leaves Amar and marries Kailash, her father's choice. Radhika starts admiring Kailash because of his love and good care. Amar avenges this betrayal by marrying Radhika's younger sister Priyanka.

Cast

Main 

 Thanuja Puttaswamy as Radhika; Krishna Murthy and Sujatha's elder daughter; Priyanka's sister; Kailash's wife; Shakuntala Devi's daughter-in-law; Amar's ex-lover
 Akarsh Byramudi as Amar; Radhika's ex-lover; Priyanka's husband; 
 Navin Vetri / Siddharth Varma as Kailash; Radhika's husband; Shakuntala Devi's son; Krishna Murthy and Sujatha's son-in-law
 Maahi Gouthami as Priyanka; Krishna Murthy and Sujatha's younger daughter; Radhika's sister; Amar's wife;

Recurring 
 Sirisha as Shankuntala Devi; Kailash's mother; Radhika's mother-in-law
 Prabhakar as Krishna Murthy; Radhika and Priyanka's father; Sujatha's husband
 Shanthi as Sujatha; Radhika and Priyanka's mother; Krishna Murthy's wife
 Anu Manasa as Aliveni; Kailash's Aunt; Malleswari's mother
 Vani Reddy as Malleswari; Aliveni's daughter;
 Puru Reddy as Alivelu's husband; Malleshwari's father
 Jeedigunta Sridhar as Satyam; Radhika and Priyanka's uncle; Lavanya's father
 Aishwarya as Lavanya; Satyam's daughter;
 Jaya Prakash as Amar's father
 Maithili as Amar's step mother
 Sainath as Amar and Radhika's classmate and friend
 Hareesh as Amar and Radhika's classmate and friend
 Pawan as Amar and Radhika's classmate and friend
 Tenali Panthulu as Kailash and Radhika's marriage priest

Cameo Appearances 

 Deepthi Manne as Akshara (reprised her role from Radhamma Kuthuru)
 Meghana Rami as Radhamma (reprised her role from Radhamma Kuthuru)

Dubbed version

References

External links 
 Agnipariksha on ZEE5

Zee Telugu original programming
Indian television series
Telugu-language television shows
2021 Indian television series debuts
Indian television soap operas